In analysis of works of fiction, revisionism denotes the retelling of a conventional or established narrative with significant variations which deliberately "revise" the view shown in the original work.  For example, the film Dances with Wolves may be regarded as a revisionist western because it portrays Native Americans sympathetically instead of as the savages of traditional westerns. 
Many original works of fantasy appear to retell fairy tales in a revisionist manner. The genre of "Arthurian literature" includes innumerable variations from themes of the classic tales of King Arthur. It is debatable whether any particular examples set out to create a revised view except The Mists of Avalon.

See also
Continuation novel
Copyright protection for fictional characters
 Fan fiction
 Mashup (book)
 
 Reboot (fiction)
 Retcon
 
 Spiritual successor

References

Narratology